Jonah Howe (1749–1826) was a lawyer and farmer from Shrewsbury, Massachusetts and member of the Massachusetts House of Representatives.

Personal background and family relations
Jonah Howe was born in Shrewsbury, Massachusetts on 2 January 1749 to Daniel Howe (1727-1750) and Eunice (Taylor) Howe (1729-?).  He was a lawyer.  Jonah Howe, Esq married Prudence Bowker (1751-1795), daughter of Lt. Charles Bowker and Eunice Stone, on 4 July 1771 at Shrewsbury.  On 4 June 1819 he married Candace Allen in Shrewsbury.  He was elected to the Massachusetts House of Representatives from the Shrewsbury, Worcester District.  Howe died at his home in Shrewsbury on 2 July 1826.

References 

Members of the Massachusetts House of Representatives
1749 births
1826 deaths
People from Shrewsbury, Massachusetts